Gowrie is a province in Scotland.

Gowrie may also refer to:

Australia

People 
 Alexander Hore-Ruthven, 1st Earl of Gowrie (1872–1955), British soldier, longest-serving Governor-General of Australia
 Zara Hore-Ruthven, Countess of Gowrie, wife of Alexander Hore-Ruthven, 1st Earl of Gowrie, after whom Lady Gowrie Child Centres were named

Places

Australian Capital Territory 
 Gowrie, Australian Capital Territory, a suburb of Canberra

New South Wales 
 Gowrie, New South Wales, a locality

Queensland 
 Gowrie, Queensland, a town in the Toowoomba Region
 Gowrie House, a heritage-listed villa in Toowoomba
 Gowrie Mountain, Queensland, a locality in the Toowoomba Region
 Shire of Gowrie, a former local government area, now within the Toowoomba Region

Victoria 
 Gowrie railway station, Melbourne

United Kingdom 

Carse of Gowrie, the southern part of Gowrie noted for its farmland
Gowrie Park, Dundee, Scotland
Earl of Gowrie, a peerage title in Scotland and the United Kingdom, including a list of people with the title
Gowrie House, Perth, Scotland

United States 

Gowrie, Iowa, United States
Gowrie Township, Webster County, Iowa, United States

Other uses

 , a number of motor vessels with this name
 , a number of steamships with this name

See also

 Lord Gowrie (disambiguation)